A Postmaster General, in Anglosphere countries, is the chief executive officer of the postal service of that country, a ministerial office responsible for overseeing all other postmasters.  The practice of having a government official responsible for overseeing the delivery of mail throughout the nation originated in England, where a 'Master of the Posts' is mentioned in the King's Book of Payments, with a payment of £100 being authorised for Sir Brian Tuke as 'Master of the King's Post' in February 1512.  Belatedly, in 1517, he was officially appointed to the office of 'Governor of the King's Posts', a precursor to the office of Postmaster General of the United Kingdom, by King Henry VIII.  In 1609, it was decreed that letters could only be carried and delivered by persons authorised by the Postmaster General.

In the United Kingdom, the office of Postmaster General was abolished in 1969, being replaced by the Minister of Posts and Telecommunications.  In turn, its functions were subsequently transferred to the Secretary of State at the Department of Trade and Industry (DTI).

Other examples include:

References